Henry Merkley (1758–1840) was a farmer and political figure in Upper Canada. He represented Dundas in the Legislative Assembly of Upper Canada from 1808 to 1812.

He was born in the Thirteen Colonies, the son of Christopher Merkley, of German descent, and served in the King's Royal Regiment of New York. After the American Revolution, Merkley came to Montreal and later settled in Williamsburgh Township. He was a Major in the Dundas County Militia during the War of 1812, later reaching the rank of lieutenant-colonel. Merkley was present at the Battle of Crysler's Farm.

References 

Becoming Prominent: Leadership in Upper Canada, 1791–1841, J.K. Johnson (1989)
 

1758 births
1840 deaths
Members of the Legislative Assembly of Upper Canada
Military personnel from Albany, New York
Politicians from Albany, New York
People from the United Counties of Stormont, Dundas and Glengarry
Canadian people of the War of 1812